Ungmennafélagið Tindastóll, commonly known as Tindastóll, is an Icelandic sports club founded in 1907 and based in Sauðárkrókur. Tindastóll is a multisport club and is best known for its men's basketball team which plays in the top-tier Úrvalsdeild karla.

Basketball

Tindastóll men's basketball team advanced to the Úrvalsdeild karla Finals in 2015 and 2018, losing to KR both times. On January 13, 2018, the club won its first major title when it beat KR in the Icelandic Basketball Cup finals.

Football

Tindastóll's football department fields teams in both the men's and women's league. In September 2020, Tindastóll women's team achieved promotion to the top-tier Úrvalsdeild kvenna for the first time in its history.

References

External links

 
Multi-sport clubs in Iceland
1907 establishments in Iceland
Sauðárkrókur